San Pedro is an unincorporated community in Houston County, Texas. San Pedro was founded in the 1840s, and had a post office from 1848 to 1857 and from 1858 to 1905. In the 1930s the community consisted of a church, a cemetery, and a number of houses. By the 1990s, only the church and cemetery remained.

References

Unincorporated communities in Houston County, Texas
Unincorporated communities in Texas
1848 establishments in Texas